Jack the Ripper is a 1959 film produced and directed by Monty Berman and Robert S. Baker. It is loosely based on Leonard Matters' theory that Jack the Ripper was an avenging doctor. The  black-and-white film stars Lee Patterson and Eddie Byrne and co-stars Betty McDowall, John Le Mesurier, and Ewen Solon. It was released in England in 1959, and shown in the U.S. in 1960.

The plot is a "whodunit" with false leads and a denouement in which the least likely character, in this case "Sir David Rogers" played by Ewen Solon, is revealed as the culprit. As in Matters' book, The Mystery of Jack the Ripper, Solon's character murders prostitutes to avenge the death of his son. While Matters had the son dying from venereal disease, the film has him committing suicide on learning his lover is a prostitute.

Plot

In 1888, Jack the Ripper is on his killing spree. Scotland Yard Inspector O'Neill (Byrne) welcomes a visit from his old friend, New York City detective Sam Lowry (Patterson), who agrees to assist with the investigation. Sam becomes attracted to modern woman Anne Ford (McDowall) but her guardian, Dr. Tranter (Le Mesurier), doesn't approve. The police slowly close in on the killer as the public becomes more alarmed. The killer's identity is revealed and he meets a ghastly end.

Cast
 Lee Patterson as Sam Lowry
 Eddie Byrne as Inspector O'Neill
 Betty McDowall as Anne Ford
 Ewen Solon as Sir David Rogers
 John Le Mesurier as Dr. Tranter
 George Rose as Clarke
 Philip Leaver as Music Hall Manager
 Barbara Burke as Kitty Knowles
 Anne Sharp as Helen
 Denis Shaw as Simes
 Jack Allen as Assistant Commissioner Hodges
 Jane Taylor as Hazel
 Dorinda Stevens as Margaret
 Hal Osmond as Snakey the pickpocket
 Patricia Phoenix as rowdy woman in crowd

Production

The film's budget was raised from a combination of pre-sales to Regal Film Distributors at the National Film Finance Corporation. The film was prepared in different edits to accommodate various territories' tolerance of nudity and violence. The British version was subject to some BBFC trims, including a moment at the end where the movie switched from black and white to color as blood materialized on the floor. A racier continental version was released in France.

Release
Joseph E. Levine bought the US rights for £50,000. He later claimed he spent $1 million on promoting the movie and earned $2 million in profit on it. Levine replaced the Stanley Black score with a new one composed by Jimmy McHugh and Pete Rugolo, added some narration to the opening moments, rearranged the credits to move most of the technical credits to the end while changing the font for the opening title sequence, and restored the color blood insert at the end that had been removed on orders of the BBFC.

According to Variety, the film earned rentals of $1.1 million in North America on initial release.

After Paramount's U.S. rights expired, the film circulated mostly in public domain bootlegs until Severin Films released a licensed Blu-ray edition in America on Black Friday 2017. That limited pressing was a 2-disc edition  with a Blu disc containing HD transfers of the British version (mastered at 1.33 ratio) and the American version (mastered at 1.66), and a DVD containing a SD reconstruction of the European "continental" edition using bits from the US and UK prints and tape sourced material for the alternate nude footage (with alternating aspect ratios accounting for the different source prints), along with an exclusive slipcover reproducing the jacket art of the source novel. A single disc release without the bonus DVD was mass market released shortly after that initial offering on January 8, 2018. In 2019, a collector provided a film element for the European cut, and after scanning it, Severin made a new HD hybrid cut using its nude scenes with the American print (mastered at a consistent 1.66 ratio), and released it on Blu-Ray at a discounted price beginning with its Black Friday sale that year, so previous buyers could effectively replace the previous DVD from the limited edition. The single disc Blu and the European Blu are still available at their website.

Regrettably, the film element used for the American version is a less-than-ideal 16mm copy, which had itself been borrowed from the Library of Congress. The aspect ratio of 1.66 to 1 is a center extraction of that print. The 35mm negative and fine grain have been lost, and have never been found.

Critical reception

The New York Times called it a "shoddy horror feature" that was "extravagant only in its amount of gore." The Tampa Tribune said it was "an interesting motion picture with a cast of reasonably talented unknowns" and said that it contained "one of the most effective shock devices dreamed up by movie men in some time".

Box Office
According to Kinematograph Weekly the film performed "better than average" at the British box office in 1959.

References

External links

Films set in 1888
1959 films
1959 horror films
British black-and-white films
1950s crime films
1950s historical horror films
British historical horror films
Films set in London
Films about Jack the Ripper
Paramount Pictures films
1950s serial killer films
Films with screenplays by Jimmy Sangster
British crime films
British serial killer films
Films directed by Monty Berman
Films directed by Robert S. Baker
1950s English-language films
1950s British films